The Women's marathon 5 was a wheelchair marathon event in athletics at the 1984 Summer Paralympics. The race was won by Juana Soto. Only two athletes, both from Mexico, competed. Both reached the finish.

Results

See also
 Marathon at the Paralympics

References 

Men's marathon 5
1984 marathons
Marathons at the Paralympics
1984 Summer
Summer Paralympics marathon 5
Marathons in the United States